Artistes 8.8 Fund Raising Campaign (88水災關愛行動) was a major fund raising campaign held in Hong Kong for the victims of the 2009 Typhoon Morakot.  The concert began at 7:30pm on 17 August 2009.  The 88 stood for 8 August, one of the day of the typhoon.  The main host for the concert was HK actor Eric Tsang and Taiwan actress Sylvia Chang.  The show featured more than 200 stars mostly from Hong Kong.  The show was also tele-linked live to Taiwan and some of their stars.

Preparation
A number of other hosts also took part including Paw hee-ching, Harlem Yu, Wu hsiao-li (吳小莉), Astrid Chan (芷菁).  A theme song "Many hearts prevail" (滔滔千里心) was also part of the show.  Major banks such as Bank of China and Fubon Bank also took part in managing the funds.

Participants
The following are some of the participants.

Edison Chen controversy
Edison Chen tried to make an appearance into the fund raising campaign.  Fellow actor Eric Tsang tried to talk HK station TVB into letting him in.  TVB computer technicians were ready to put Chen's name up should he appear at the concert, but Chen was turned down by the station.  He did not appear on stage.

See also
 Artistes 512 Fund Raising Campaign
 Artistes 414 Fund Raising Campaign

References

https://www.youtube.com/user/typhoontaiwan88/videos
Music festivals in Hong Kong
Benefit concerts
2009 in Hong Kong